The John Eyler Farmstead is a historic home and farm complex located at Thurmont, Frederick County, Maryland, United States. It includes a two-story, side-passage Flemish bond brick farmhouse with a rear wing built about 1820, a stone springhouse ruin, and a brick silo.

The John Eyler Farmstead was listed on the National Register of Historic Places in 2006.

References

External links
, including photo from 2005, at Maryland Historical Trust

Houses in Frederick County, Maryland
Houses on the National Register of Historic Places in Maryland
National Register of Historic Places in Frederick County, Maryland